The 15th National Hockey League All-Star Game took place at Chicago Stadium on October 7, 1961. The NHL All-Stars defeated the hometown Chicago Black Hawks 3–1.

Red Wing Line Leads Stars to Victory 
The Detroit Red Wings' line of Gordie Howe, Alex Delvecchio and Norm Ullman opened and closed the scoring, as the NHL All-Stars toppled the Stanley Cup champion Chicago Black Hawks 3-1 before a record crowd of 14,534 spectators.
Delvecchio opened the scoring twelve minutes into the first period on assists from Howe and Ullman, and Howe closed the scoring twelve minutes into the second period on assists from Delvecchio and Ullman. Don McKenney of the Boston Bruins also scored for the All-Stars, while Eric Nesterenko beat Toronto Maple Leafs' Johnny Bower for Chicago's only goal.

Game summary

Referee: Frank Udvari
Linesmen: George Hayes and Neil Armstrong
Attendance: 14,534

References 

National Hockey League All-Star Games
All-Star Game
1961
1961 in Illinois
Ice hockey competitions in Chicago
1960s in Chicago
October 1961 sports events in the United States